Rodolfo Joaquín Concepción, (1912 – 1940) was a popular Filipino film actor during the 1930s. He was dubbed Ang Idolong Kayumanggi (Brown Idol).

Career
Concepción made his film debut in 1935, in Kundiman ng Puso (Song of Heart).

He was often paired romantically in films with the soprano Rosario Moreno, with whom he co-starred in Mapait na Lihim (1938). Concepcion himself was also a notable singer, with a distinctive singing style.  Unusual for actors of the time, his own singing voice was used.

After six movies for Sampaguita Pictures, becoming one of its most bankable stars, Concepción signed with another production company Excelsior Pictures, where he made Pakiusap,  Ikaw Pa Rin, Tunay Na Ina (opposite Rosario Moreno), and his last unfinished movie Mahal Pa Rin Kita. Pakiusap and Tunay na Ina are two of only five Filipino films to survive World War II.

Death
At age 28, the latter died of a peptic ulcer in 1940 during the shooting of Mahal Pa Rin Kita.

Legacy & Honors
In the early 1950s, Pancho Magalona portrayed Rudy Concepción in a biographical movie called Kasaysayan ni Rudy, opposite Linda Estrella.

He was posthumously inducted to the Eastwood City Walk Of Fame in June 2008.

Filmography
1935 - Kundiman ng Puso
1935 - Sumpa ng Aswang
1936 - Buhok ni Ester
1938 - Walang Pangalan  (Parlatone Hispano-Filipino)
1938 - Paru-Parong Bukid - (Sampaguita Pictures)
1938 - Himagsikan ng Puso - (Sampaguita Pictures)
1938 - Alipin ng Palad  - (Sampaguita Pictures)
1938 - Mapait na Lihim  - (Sampaguita Pictures)
1939 - Gabay ng Magulang  - (Sampaguita Pictures)
1939 - Walang Tahanan  - (Sampaguita Pictures)
1939 - Tunay na Ina (Excelsior Pictures)
1940 - Pakiusap  (Excelsior Pictures)
1940 - Ikaw Rin  (Excelsior Pictures)
1940 - Mahal Pa Rin Kita  (Excelsior Pictures)

Awards
Posthumous Celebrity Inductee, Eastwood City Walk Of Fame Philippines June 2008

Notes

References

External links
 

1915 births
1941 deaths
20th-century Filipino male actors